Agnes White may refer to:
 Agnes Ward White, first lady of West Virginia
 Agnes Romilly White, Irish novelist